The East Midlands Rugby Football Union (EMRFU) is a governing body for rugby union in part of The Midlands, England. The union is the constituent body of the Rugby Football Union for the counties of Bedfordshire and Northamptonshire and the Huntingdonshire and Peterborough districts of Cambridgeshire and administers and organises rugby union clubs and competitions in those areas.  It also administers the East Midlands county rugby representative teams.

Organisation 
The EMRFU has four sub-counties, each responsible for a particular geographical area. The sub-counties are the East Northants Rugby Union, Bedfordshire County Rugby Football Union, Northampton & District Rugby Alliance and the Huntingdonshire & Peterborough Rugby Union.

County team 

The East Midlands senior men's county team currently competes in the Division 2 of the English County Championship.

Honours 
County Championship winners (2): 1934, 1951
County Championship Division 2 winners: 2016

Affiliated Clubs

There are 45 clubs currently affiliated to EMRFU, listed below.
Source:

 Ampthill
 Bedford Athletic
 Bedford Blues
 Bedford Queens RFC
 Bedford Swifts RFC
 Biggleswade
 Bletchley
 Brackley RFC
 Bugbrooke RFC
 Corby RFC
 Cranfield University RFC
 Daventry RFC
 Deepings RFC
 Dunstablians
 Huntingdon & District RFC
 Kempston RFC
 Kettering
 Leighton Buzzard
 Long Buckby RFC
 Luton
 Milton Keynes
 Northampton BBOB RFC
 Northampton Casuals RFC
 Northampton Heathens RFC
 Northampton Mens Own RFC
 Northampton Old Scouts RFC
 Northampton Outlaws RFC
 Old Northamptonians
 Olney
 Oundle RFC
 Peterborough
 Peterborough Lions
 Rushden & Higham
 Shambrook & Colworth RFC
 Spalding RFC
 Stamford RFC
 St Ives
 St Neots
 Stewarts & Lloyds RFC
 Stockwood Park RFC
 Thorney
 Towcestrians
 Wellingborough Old Grammarians
 Wellingborough RFC
 Winslow RFC

East Midlands club competitions 

The East Midlands RFU currently runs the following competitions for club sides:

Cups

East Midlands Cup  - open to clubs in Bedfordshire, Northamptonshire and parts of Cambridgeshire, typically playing at tiers 5-7 of the English rugby union system

Discontinued competitions

Midlands 5 East (South) - tier 10 league that ran between 2006 and 2010
East Midlands/Leicestershire 1 – tier 7-10 league for East Midlands and Leicestershire based clubs that ran between 1987 and 2000
East Midlands/Leicestershire 2 – tier 10-11 league for East Midlands and Leicestershire based clubs that ran intermittently between 1992 and 2000
East Midlands/Leicestershire 3 – tier 11-12 league for East Midlands and Leicestershire based clubs that ran intermittently between 1992 and 2000
East Midlands/Leicestershire 4 – tier 12-13 league for East Midlands and Leicestershire based clubs that ran between 1992 and 1996
East Midlands 1 – tier 8-10 league that ran intermittently between 1987 and 2004
East Midlands 2 – tier 9-10 league that ran intermittently between 1987 and 2004
East Midlands 3 – tier 10 league that ran between 1987 and 1992

Notes

See also
Midland Division
English rugby union system

References

External links 
 East Midlands Rugby Union official website

Rugby union governing bodies in England
1897 establishments in England
Sports organizations established in 1897
Rugby union in Northamptonshire
Rugby union in Bedfordshire
Sport in Huntingdonshire
Sport in Peterborough